Ottawa County is a county located in the U.S. state of Michigan. As of the United States 2020 Census, the population was 296,200. The county seat is Grand Haven. The county is named for the Ottawa Nation, was set off in 1831 and organized in 1837. Ottawa County is included in the Grand Rapids-Kentwood, MI Metropolitan Statistical Area and has a significant Dutch American population. Since the late 19th century, the county has strongly supportive of the Republican Party. As of 2023, the county's board of commissioners has been described as far-right by national and Michigan-based media organizations, with former official of President Donald Trump, John Gibbs, chosen by the board to serve as the county administrator.

History 
Before European settlers arrived, this area was home to the Potawatomi and Ottawa people for centuries. The Grand River was used as a trade route into the interior of Michigan. Much of what we know about the Native American presence in Ottawa County comes from the excavation of archeological artifacts at places like the Battle Point Site.

The city dates its European-American founding to French colonial settlers. A fur trading outpost called Gabagouache was first established by Madeline La Framboise and her husband Joseph.

The first permanent settler of the County was a Presbyterian minister, William Montague Ferry, who settled in Grand Haven in 1834. Grand Haven quickly grew and became an important port for trade and travel. Ferry is often referred to as the "father" of Ottawa County.

Dutch settlers started arriving in the area in 1847, led by Albertus van Raalte. These Dutch Settlers moved into the Holland area. This area was already inhabited by many Odawa (Ottawa) people as well as the Old Wing Mission. Within just a few years, the new Dutch settlers had forced out the Ottawa people and the Old Wing Mission.

Geography

Bodies of water

 Bass River
 Black Lake (partially)
 Grand River
 Lake Macatawa
 Lake Michigan
 Macatawa River
 Pigeon River
 Spring Lake

Adjacent counties
By land
 Allegan County – south
 Kent County – east
 Muskegon County – north
By water

 Milwaukee County, Wisconsin – northwest
 Racine County, Wisconsin – southwest

Major highways

Demographics 

As of the 2010 United States Census, there were 263,801 people living in the county. 90.1% were White, 2.6% Asian, 1.5% Black or African American, 0.4% Native American, 3.4% of some other race and 2.0% of two or more races. 8.6% were Hispanic or Latino (of any race). 31.0% were of Dutch, 14.2% German, 5.8% English and 5.7% Irish ancestry.

As of the 2000 United States Census, there were 238,314 people, 81,662 households, and 61,328 families in the county. There were 86,856 housing units at an average density of 154 per square mile (59/km2). The racial makeup of the county was 91.52% White, 1.05% Black or African American, 0.36% Native American, 2.09% Asian, 0.02% Pacific Islander, 3.48% from other races, and 1.48% from two or more races. 7.00% of the population were Hispanic or Latino of any race. 37.3% reported being of Dutch, 14.6% German, 6.2% English, 5.6% Irish and 5.4% American ancestry, 91.5% spoke only English at home; 5.4% spoke Spanish.

There were 81,662 households, out of which 39.30% had children under the age of 18 living with them, 64.60% were married couples living together, 7.50% had a female householder with no husband present, and 24.90% were non-families. 19.60% of all households were made up of individuals, and 7.40% had someone living alone who was 65 years of age or older. The average household size was 2.81 and the average family size was 3.25.

The county has numerous seasonal residents during the summer. Port Sheldon Township has many lakefront homes and other inland retreats that serve as summer getaways for residents of Grand Rapids, Detroit, and Chicago. No official statistics are compiled on seasonal residents.

The county population contains 28.70% under the age of 18, 11.90% from 18 to 24, 29.30% from 25 to 44, 20.00% from 45 to 64, and 10.10% who were 65 years of age or older. The median age was 32 years. For every 100 females, there were 97.00 males. For every 100 females age 18 and over, there were 94.20 males.

The Robert Wood Johnson Foundation ranks Ottawa County as Michigan's second-healthiest county, preceded only by the leisure-oriented Traverse City area.

The median income for a household in the county was $52,347, and the median income for a family was $59,896. Males had a median income of $42,180 versus $27,706 for females. The per capita income for the county was $21,676. About 3.10% of families and 5.50% of the population were below the poverty line, including 4.70% of those under age 18 and 4.90% of those age 65 or over.

Religion
 The Catholic Church has 11 churches and 24,700 members.
 The Christian Reformed Church in North America has 67 churches and 33,700 members.
 The Church of Jesus Christ of Latter-day Saints has two meetinghouses in the county.
 The Protestant Reformed Churches have around 10 large congregations in the county.
 The Reformed Church in America has 47 congregations and 33,300 members.

Government
Ottawa County operates the County jail, maintains rural roads, operates the major local courts, records deeds, mortgages, and vital records, administers public health regulations, and participates with the state in the provision of social services. The county board of commissioners controls the budget and has limited authority to make laws or ordinances. In Michigan, most local government functions – police and fire, building and zoning, tax assessment, street maintenance etc. – are the responsibility of individual cities and townships.

Most of the county's offices are located in either the city of Grand Haven or at the Fillmore complex in Olive Township.

Elected officials

 County clerk/Register of Deeds – Justin F. Roebuck
 County Commissioners
 County Treasurer – Amanda Price
 Prosecuting Attorney – Lee F. Fisher
 Sheriff – Steve Kempker
 Water Resources Commissioner – Joe Bush

(information as of September 2022)

Local policies
Beginning in 2012, County Administrator Alan Vanderberg and the Board of Commissioners adopted the "Four Cs" Initiative including "Cultural Intelligence." At that time, Vanderberg asserted that "discrimination is not only alive and well, but it will also negatively impact the future prosperity of Ottawa County and West Michigan if not addressed. I have listened to the CEOs of some of West Michigan’s top businesses state that access to global talent is a major determinant of their company’s solvency. Some of these same leaders disclosed that an inability to create diverse teams in the future could lead to the relocation of corporate headquarters or company divisions to larger, more diverse areas...Talent can be homegrown in some cases, but a competition to attract global talent is currently happening and it will only intensify. The future prosperity of West Michigan hinges upon pursuing and welcoming diversity." The county rebranded in 2017 as a means to establish a high quality visual identity that better matched the quality organization of Ottawa County. The county also adopted the slogan "Where you belong." Vanderberg said the slogan is intended to let everyone, regardless of color, ethnic background, sexual identity, religion or other qualifier, know they are welcome in Ottawa County.

The far-right county board made numerous changes on their first meeting when sworn in on January 3, 2023; the county motto "Where You Belong" was changed to "Where Freedom Rings", the Diversity, equity, and inclusion branch was dissolved, the head health official was replaced and a conservative law organization their main legal representative. The conservative group that promoted the new board members, according to Fox 17, was against the mandated COVID-19 safety measures and cultural diversity policies. Instability surrounding the county board raised concerns about the county's bond credit rating being lowered from its AAA status according to MLive.

Politics

Ottawa County has long been one of the most consistently Republican counties in Michigan and the country. The last Democratic Party candidate to carry the county was George B. McClellan in 1864. In 1912, incumbent Republican president William Howard Taft lost the county to "Bull Moose Party" candidate and former Republican President Theodore Roosevelt.

The county is very Republican even by the standards of traditionally Republican West Michigan. As a measure of how Republican the county has been since then, it has rejected Democratic presidential candidates even in national Democratic landslides. It was one of the few counties where Franklin Roosevelt was shut out in all four of his presidential bids, and was one of only three counties in the state to vote for Barry Goldwater over Lyndon Johnson in 1964; Johnson won 45% of the county's vote, the last time a Democrat won at least 40% of the county's vote. During the 1986 gubernatorial election, it was the only county not to back James Blanchard for a second term. 

In 2008, it was one of the only two counties in Michigan where Barack Obama did not win 40 percent of the county's vote, and his weakest county, being the only one where John McCain received more than 60 percent of the vote, as he won it by 24 points while Obama carried the state by 16.5 points. In 2020, Joe Biden had the best performance of any Democratic presidential candidate in Ottawa County since 1964. During the COVID-19 pandemic in Michigan, county officials and their families faced death threats following the introduction of mask mandates at public schools, with conservative groups influencing the 2022 Michigan elections to "preserve local heritage". A far-right government that some described as holding Christian nationalist values was subsequently elected in the 2022 elections.

Perhaps the most prominent politician in Ottawa County History was Grand Haven's Thomas W. Ferry. Thomas Ferry served as an Ottawa County Clerk at age 21. He went on to become a member of the Michigan House of Representatives, the Michigan Senate, the U.S. House of Representatives and the U.S. Senate. While in the U.S. Senate, he served as President Pro Tempore (during the 44th and 45th congresses). As Pro Tempore, he became, upon the death of Vice President Henry Wilson on November 22, 1875, next in the line of presidential succession, and remained so until March 4, 1877.

Communities

Cities

 Coopersville
 Ferrysburg
 Grand Haven (county seat)
 Holland
 Hudsonville
 Zeeland

Village
 Spring Lake

Census-designated places
 Allendale
 Beechwood
 Jenison

Other unincorporated communities

 Agnew
 Bauer
 Beaverdam
 Big Spring
 Blendon
 Borculo
 Conger
 Conklin
 Crisp
 Crockery Lake
 Dennison
 Drenthe
 Eastmanville
 Finnasey
 Forest Grove
 Gooding
 Grand Valley
 Harlem Station
 Harrisburg
 Herrington
 Jamestown
 Lamont (called Steele's Landing 1851–1856)
 Lisbon
 Macatawa
 Marne
 Noordeloos
 North Blendon
 Nunica
 Ottawa Center
 Pearline (also called East Allendale)
 Port Sheldon
 Reno
 Robinson
 Spoonville
 Tallmadge
 Vriesland
 West Olive
 Wright

Townships

 Allendale Charter Township
 Blendon Township
 Chester Township
 Crockery Township
 Georgetown Charter Township
 Grand Haven Charter Township
 Holland Charter Township
 Jamestown Charter Township
 Olive Township
 Park Township
 Polkton Charter Township
 Port Sheldon Township
 Robinson Township
 Spring Lake Township
 Tallmadge Charter Township
 Wright Township
 Zeeland Charter Township

See also
 List of Michigan State Historic Sites in Ottawa County, Michigan
 National Register of Historic Places listings in Ottawa County, Michigan

References

External links
 
 County of Ottawa
 Grand Haven & Tri-Cities Alumni

 
Michigan counties
Grand Rapids metropolitan area
1837 establishments in Michigan
Populated places established in 1837